The Genuine Risk Handicap is a race for thoroughbred race horses, open to fillies and mares age three and up. The race is run each spring at six furlongs on the dirt at Belmont Park in New York and offers a purse of $150,000.

The Grade II Genuine Risk is named after the second filly of only three to win the Kentucky Derby in 1980.  Genuine Risk was inducted into the National Museum of Racing and Hall of Fame in 1986. In the Blood-Horse magazine List of the Top 100 Racehorses of the 20th Century, she was ranked #91.

In December 2006, the New York Racing Association {NYRA} announced the elimination of this race beginning in 2007 due to its poor placement on the Breeder's Cup Sprint run-up schedule.

Past winners

Some past winners of the Genuine Risk Handicap are:

2006 - Behaving Badly (Victor Espinoza)
2005 - Bank Audit
2002 - Bear Fan
2003 - Shine Again
2002 - Xtra Heat (Harry Vega)
2001 - Katz Me If You Can
1992 - Wide Country
1991 - Safely Kept
1990 - Safely Kept
1989 - Safely Kept

External links
 Belmont Park race track

Graded stakes races in the United States
Sprint category horse races for fillies and mares
Horse races in New York (state)
Discontinued horse races
2007 disestablishments in New York (state)
Recurring sporting events disestablished in 2007